Jean-Baptiste du Val-de-Grâce, baron de Cloots (24 June 1755 – 24 March 1794), better known as Anacharsis Cloots (also spelled Clootz), was a Prussian nobleman who was a significant figure in the French Revolution. Perhaps the first to advocate a world parliament, long before Albert Camus and Albert Einstein, he was a world federalist and an internationalist anarchist. He was nicknamed "orator of mankind", "citizen of humanity" and "a personal enemy of God".

Biography

Early life
The young Cloots, heir to a great fortune, was sent to Paris at age eleven to complete his education, and became attracted to the theories of his uncle the abbé Cornelius de Pauw (1739–1799), philosophe, geographer and diplomat at the court of Frederick II of Prussia. His father placed him in the military academy of Berlin, but he withdrew at the age of twenty and travelled through Europe, preaching his revolutionary philosophy and spending his money as a man of pleasure.

Revolution

On the breaking out of the Revolution, Cloots returned in 1789 to Paris, thinking the opportunity favorable for establishing his dream of a universal family of nations. On 19 June 1790 he appeared at the bar of the National Constituent Assembly at the head of thirty-six foreigners, and, in the name of this embassy of the human race, declared that the world adhered to the Declaration of the Rights of Man and of the Citizen. After this, he was known as the orator of the human race, by which title he called himself, dropping that of baron, and substituting for his baptismal names the pseudonym of Anacharsis, from Jean-Jacques Barthélemy's famous philosophical romance Travels of Anacharsis the Younger in Greece.

In 1792 he placed 12,000 livres at the disposal of the French Republic for the arming of forty or fifty fighters in the cause of man against tyranny (see French Revolutionary Wars). After the riots of 10 August he became an even more prominent supporter of new ideas, and declared himself "the personal enemy of Jesus Christ", abjuring all revealed religions.

Convention
In the same month he had the rights of French citizenship conferred on him; and, having in September been elected a member of the National Convention, he voted in favor of capital punishment for King Louis XVI, justifying it in the name of the human race, and was an active partisan of the war of propaganda.

Execution
Excluded at the insistence of Maximilien Robespierre from the Jacobin Club, he remained a foreigner in many eyes. When the Committee of Public Safety levelled accusations of treason against the Hébertists, they also implicated Cloots to give substance to their charge of a foreign plot. Although his innocence was manifest, he was condemned and subsequently guillotined on 24 March 1794. He incongruously followed Vincent, Ronsin, Momoro and the rest of the Hébertist leadership to the scaffold, in front of the largest crowd ever assembled for a public execution.

Thought
Cloots was an original political thinker who crafted his own interpretation of the meaning of the French Revolution. He was a proponent of the world state, and he sought to promote a more broad-minded and internationalist understanding of the Revolution's potential. He imagined the institutions of the world state along the lines of those of the French Revolutionary Republic. Cloots's thought was expressed in several works, most importantly in his Bases constitutionnelles de la République du genre humain.

Works

La Certitude des preuves du mahométisme (London, 1780), published under the pseudonym of Ali-GurBer, in answer to Nicolas-Sylvestre Bergier's Certitude des preuves du christianisme
L'Orateur du genre humain, ou Dépêches du Prussien Cloots au Prussien Herzberg (Paris, 1791)
La République universelle ou adresse aux tyrannicides (1792).
Adresse d'un Prussien à un Anglais (Paris, 1790), 52 p. 
Bases constitutionnelles de la République du genre humain (Paris, 1793), 48 p. 
Voltaire triomphant ou les prêtres déçus (178?), 30 p. Attributed to Cloots. 
Discours prononcé à la barre de l'Assemblée nationale par M. de Cloots, du Val-de-Grâce,... à la séance du 19 juin 1790 (1790), 4 p.

References

Notes

Sources
  In turn, it cites as references:
 Avenel, Georges (1865), Anacharsis Cloots, l'orateur du genre humain, 2 vols., Paris: reprint Editions Champ Libre, 1976
 H. Baulig's articles in La Révolution française, tome 41 (1901)
 Labbé, François (1999), Anarchasis Cloots, le Prussien francophile. Un philosophe au service de la Révolution française et universelle, Paris, L'Harmattan, coll. l'Allemagne d'ier et d'aujourd'hui, 546 p.
 Book review by Annie Duprat, «Anarchasis Cloots, le Prussien francophile. Un philosophe au service de la Révolution française et universelle», in Annales historiques de la Révolution française, Numéro 324, [En ligne], mis en ligne le : 10 avril 2006. URL : . Consulté le 21 octobre 2006.
 Mortier, Roland (1995), Anacharsis Cloots ou L'utopie foudroyée, Paris: Stock, 350 p.

1755 births
1794 deaths
People from Kleve
French atheism activists
Deputies to the French National Convention
French essayists
Barons of the Holy Roman Empire
French religious writers
French people of Dutch descent
People from the Duchy of Cleves
French people executed by guillotine during the French Revolution
German emigrants to France
Executed Dutch people
Executed people from North Rhine-Westphalia
18th-century French writers
18th-century French male writers
French male essayists
18th-century essayists
18th-century atheists